The Gladstone Hotel is a two-story, wood-framed hotel located at 101 Main Street in Circle, Montana, United States.  The hotel was built in 1915 and inaugurated at a Christmas party on December 25 of the same year. The town of Circle had been platted the previous year after the Great Northern Railway planned its route through the area; while the hotel was supposed to provide lodging for the visitors and new settlers brought to Circle by the railroad, the railroad was not completed through Circle until 1929. Nevertheless, the hotel served as temporary lodging for new settlers in McCone County and functioned as a community meeting place, including a local bar that lasted until Prohibition. An addition was placed on the hotel in 1948 to accommodate new residents during a local oil boom.

The hotel was added to the National Register of Historic Places on August 28, 1980.

References

Hotel buildings on the National Register of Historic Places in Montana
Hotel buildings completed in 1915
1915 establishments in Montana
National Register of Historic Places in McCone County, Montana
Unused buildings in Montana